General Roberto Fierro Villalobos International Airport  is an international airport located in Chihuahua City, Chihuahua, Mexico. Operated by Grupo Aeroportuario Centro Norte (commonly known as OMA), it handles national and international air traffic of the city of Chihuahua.

In 2021, 1,363,937 passengers used Chihuahua Airport, increasing to 1,727,006 in 2022, an increase of 26.62%.

Airlines and destinations

Cargo airlines

Statistics

Passengers

Busiest routes

Accidents and incidents 
Aeromexico Flight 230 ran off the runway on July 27, 1981. 30 people died.

See also
 List of the busiest airports in Mexico

References

External links
 Grupo Aeroportuario Centro Norte de México

Airports in Chihuahua (state)